Alioğlu can refer to:

 Alioğlu, Alaplı
 Alioğlu, Kargı